Municipal elections are set to be held in Israel on 31 October 2023. In accordance with changes made in 2018, election day will be a paid day off work. All municipalities, local councils and regional councils will be up for election, as will their leaders. Top-two runoffs will be held on 14 November in all localities where no leadership candidate won 40% or more of the vote in the first round.

Voters in municipalities and local councils will pick their leader and council in two separate ballots that will be colored yellow and white respectively. Voters in regional councils will also vote for a local committee using ballots that are colored blue. blue ballots will also be used for borough committees in cases in which they exist. All elected councillors and council leaders will assume office 21 days after the election.

Eligibility 
All israeli citizens and permanent residents who are 17 or older will be eligible to vote on election day, Unlike legislative elections, where only Israeli citizens who are 18 or older are eligible to vote.

Voters are only allowed to vote in the locality in which they are registered 40 days before the election. Individuals who were registered in a different locality in the 18-month period preceding the election will not be eligible to vote.

Background and preparatory measures 
The elections will primarily concern local and national issues, and most lists set to compete will be local.

The elections were preceded by a period of political deadlock which began in 2019 and resulted in five legislative elections over the course of three years. Several new political parties have formed since the 2018 elections, such as the National Unity Party, while existing parties with local affiliates have either lost their seats in the Knesset (such as the Jewish Home, Meretz and the Green Party), or dissolved entirely (such as Kulanu). 

The Israeli Police have prepared to protect candidates, mostly from Arab localities, who are being threatened by criminal organizations.

Municipal lists are to be submitted between 27-28 September 2023.

Regional Councils 
As of May 2022, there are 54 regional councils in Israel. Voters in regional councils elect two different levels of leadership with two different ballots. One for the council's leader and one for the council's members. In some regional councils, voters also elect the members of their local committee.

Al-Batuf 
Al-Batuf Regional Council is currently led by Ahed Rahal, who was first elected in 2018.

Al-Kasom 
Al-Kasom Regional Council is led by Salama El Atrash, who was first elected via runoff in 2018.

Alona 
Alona Regional Council is led by Aryeh Sharon, who assumed office in 1999.

Eshkol 
Eshkol Regional Council is led by Gadi Yarkoni, who was first elected in a special election held in June of 2015.

Be'er Tuvia 
Be'er Tuvia Regional Council is led by Kobi Avivi, who was first elected in 2018.

Bustan al-Marj 
Bustan al-Marj Regional Council is led by Abd Ak-Kharim Zoabi, who was first elected via runoff in 2018.

Bnei Shimon 
Bnei Shimon Regional Council is led by Nir Zamir, who was first elected in 2018.

Brenner 
Brenner Regional Council is led by Doron Shidlov, who was first elected in 2012. He was unopposed for re-election in 2018.

Gederot 
Gederot Regional Council is led by Yossi Kendelsein.

Golan 
Golan Regional Council is led by Haim Rokach, who was first elected via runoff in 2018. The 2023 election will be the first to include the newly-founded Trump Heights, which is part of the council's juristiction.

Gush Etzion 
Gush Etzion Regional Council is led by Shlomo Ne'eman, who was first elected via special election in 2017. Ne'eman was re-elected via runoff in 2018.

Gezer 
Gezer Regional Council is led by Rotem Yadlin, who was first elected in 2018.

Gan Raveh 
Gan Raveh Regional Council is led by Shlomo Elimelech, who was first elected in 1991.

Drom HaSharon 
Drom HaSharon Regional Council is led by Oshrat Gani Gonen, who was first elected in 2018.

Gilboa 
Gilboa Regional Council is led by Oved Nur, who was first elected via special election in 2015. Former Councillor Shanir Friedman has announced his intention to run for the council's leadership.

Upper Galilee 
Upper Galilee Regional Council is led by Giora Salz, who will not seek re-election in 2023.

Lower Galilee 
Lower Galilee Regional Council is led by Nitzan Peleg, who was first elected in 2018. Asher Cohen, who ran against Peleg in 2018, has expressed an interest in challenging Peleg in 2023.

Central Arava 
Central Arava Regional Council is led by Meir Zur, who became the council's leader on 6 April 2021 following the resignation of his predecessor, Eyal Blum.

Har Hevron 
Har Hevron Regional Council is led by Yochai Damri, who was first elected in 2013.

Zevulun 
Zevulun Regional Council is led by Amos Netzer who was first elected via runoff in 2018.

Hevel Eilot 
Hevel Eilot Regional Council is led by Hanan Ginat who was first elected in a special election in June of 2016. Ginat was re-elected unopposed in 2018.

Hevel Yavne 
Hevel Yavne Regional Council is led by Moshe Liber, who was first elected in 2013.

Hevel Modi'in 
Hevel Modi'in Regional Council is led by Shimon Susan.

Hof Ashkelon 
Hof Ashkelon Regional Council is led by Itamar Revivo, who was first elected via runoff in 2018.

Hof HaCarmel 
Hof HaCarmel Regional Council is led by Assif Izak, who was first elected in 2018.

Hof HaSharon 
Hof HaSharon Regional Council is led by Eliyahu Bracha, who was first elected via special election in 2009. Bracha was re-elected unopposed in 2018.

Lev HaSharon 
Lev HaSharon Regional Council is led by Amir Ritov, who became its leader in 2007.

Lakhish 
Lakhish Regional Council is led by Danny Moravia, who became its leader in 2004. Moravia announced in November of 2022 that he won't seek re-election.

Mevo'ot HaHermon 
Mevo'ot HaHermon Regional Council is led by Benny Ben-Muvhar, who became its leader in 2002.

Megiddo 
Megiddo Regional Council is led by Itzik Kholavski, who is seeking a third term in office. Kholavski will be challenged by Ruti Baum and Nehamia Rievi.

Megilot 
Megilot Regional Council is led by Aryeh Cohen, who became its leader in 2015.

Mateh Asher 
Mateh Asher Regional Council is led by Moshe Davidovich, who was first elected in 2018.

Mateh Binyamin 
Mateh Binyamin Regional Council is led by Israel Gantz, who was first elected in 2018.

Mateh Yehuda 
Mateh Yehuda Regional Council is led by Niv Vizel, who was first elected in 2018. In May of 2022, Interior Minister Ayelet Shaked began the process of establishing a separate authority in Tzur Hadassah.

Menashe 
Menashe Regional Council is led by Ilan Sadeh, who became its leader in 1992. Sadeh was re-elected unopposed in 2018.

Ma'ale Yosef 
Ma'ale Yosef Regional Council is led by Shimon Guetta, who was first elected in December 2012. Guetta was re-elected for a second term in 2018.

Merom HaGalil 
Merom HaGalil Regional Council is led by Amit Sofer, was first elected in 2009.

Merhavim 
Merhavim Regional Council is led by Shai Hajaj, who became its leader in 2012. Hajaj was re-elected unopposed in 2018.

Misgav 
Misgav Regional Council is led by Danny Avri, who became its leader in 2018.

Neve Midbar 
Neve Midbar Regional Council is led by Ibrahim Al-Huasla, who was first elected in the council's first ever election in 2016.

Nahal Sorek 
Nahal Sorek Regional Council is led by Shay Reichner, who was elected in a special election in October of 2021 after his predecessor resigned to serve as head of the Israel Antiquities Authority.

Emek HaYarden 
Emek HaYarden Regional Council is led by Idan Greenbaum, who was first elected in a special election in 2016.

Emek HaMaayanot 
Emek HaMaayanot Regional Council is led by Yoram Karin, who became its leader in 2009.

Hefer Valley 
Hefer Valley Regional Council is led by Galit Shaul, who was elected in 2018, defeating her predecessor, Rani Eidan.

Emek Israel 
Jezreel Valley Regional Council is led by Eyal Baser, who became its leader in 2006.

Bik'at HaYarden 
Bik'at HaYarden Regional Council is led by David Elhayani, who became its leader in 2009.

Ramat HaNegev 
Ramat HaNegev Regional Council is led by Eran Doron, who became its leader in 2017.

Sdot Dan 
Sdot Dan Regional Council is led by David Yifrach, who was first elected in 2013. Yifrach was re-elected unopposed in 2018.

Sdot Negev 
Sdot Negev Regional Council is led by Tamir Idan, who was first elected in 2012.

Shomron 
Shomron Regional Council is led by Yossi Dagan, who was first elected in 2015 to replace Gershon Mesika. Dagan was re-elected in 2018.

In May of 2022, two settlements within the council, Sha'arei Tikva and Etz Efraim, were merged into a single settlement, Sha'ar HaShomron.

Sha'ar HaNegev 
Sha'ar HaNegev Regional Council is led by Ofir Libstein, who was elected in 2018, defeating Nira Shpak, who later became a member of the Knesset for Yesh Atid. In September of 2022, Shpak announced that she would not seek re-election to the Knesset, and would instead run for the council's leadership a second time.

Shafir 
Shafir Regional Council is led by Adir Ne'eman, who was first elected in 2018.

Tamar 
Tamar Regional Council is led by Nir Vagner, who was elected in a November 2019 special election to replace his predecessor.

Cities and Local Councils

Abu Ghosh 
Abu Ghosh is led by Salim Jaber, who is serving his fourth, nonconsecutive term. On 8 May 2022, Abu Ghosh's local council was dissolved after it failed to pass a budget, and was temporarily replaced with an Interior Ministry committee, the Ministry also held a hearing on removing Jaber from his post, but decided against it.

Abu Snan 
Abu Snan is led by Fauzi Mashlab, who was elected in 2018 via runoff.

Even Yehuda 
Even Yehuda is led by Avi Harari, who was first elected in 2013 and re-elected unopposed in 2018.

Harari's party, a broad-tent alliance of smaller parties, won ten out of the council's eleven seats in 2018. The Be'ad party, led by Zohar Abramov, won the remaining seat.

Umm Al-Fahm 
Umm al-Fahm is led by Samir Mahamed, who was first elected in 2018 via runoff.

Ofakim 
Ofakim is led by Itzik Danino, who was first elected in 2013.

Or Yehuda 
Or Yehuda is led by Liat Shohat, who was first elected via special election in September of 2015.

Or Akiva 
Or Akiva is led by Yaakov Edri, who became its leader in 2013, previously serving between 1989 and 2003. In January of 2022, the State Attorney Indicted Edri on charges of accepting bribes, fraud and breach of trust, as well as violent and tax felonies. On 13 November, City Councillor Moshe Biton announced his intention to run for Mayor.

Oranit 
Oranit is led by Nir Bartal, who was first elected in 2018.

Azor 
Azor is led by Aryeh Pechter, who became its leader in 2008.

Eilat 
Eilat is led by Eli Lankri, who became the city's acting mayor in June of 2021 after his predecessor, Meir Yitzhak Halevi, was elected to the Knesset. In August, Lankri defeated former mayor Gabi Kadosh in a special election to complete Halevi's term, winning 44.7% of the vote to Kadosh's 41.2%.

Iksal 
Iksal is led by Muhammad Shalbi, who was first elected in 2018.

Elyakhin 
Elyakhin is led by Sharoni Azuri, who was elected in 2018, unseating his predecessor. Azuri's party won five seats on Elyakhin's nine-seat council.

El'ad 
El'ad is led by Israel Porush, who was first elected in 2013 and subsequently re-elected in 2018 after his main rival, Yitzhak Pindrus, was disqualified by the Supreme Court for not living in the city. Porush will seek re-election and be opposed by Shas candidate Yehuda Butbul, who chairs the party's local chapter.

Alfei Menashe 
Alfei Menashe is led by Shy Rosenzweig, who was first elected in 2018.

Elkana 
Elkana is led by Asaf Mintzer, who was first elected in 2013.

9 Members were elected to the council in 2018. five from Mitzner's party, and two from the "Our Elkana" and "Young Elkana" lists respectively.

I'billin 
I'billin is led by Ma'amun Sheikh, who was first elected in 2010.

Efrat 
Efrat is led by Oded Revivi, who was first elected in 2008.

Ariel 
Ariel is led by Eliyau Shaviro, who became its mayor in March 2013 following the death of his predecessor, Ron Nachman.

Ashdod 
Ashdod is led by Yehiel Lasri, who was first elected in 2008.

Ashkelon 
Ashkelon is led by Tomer Glam, who became its acting mayor in 2017 and was elected to a full term in 2018.

Baqa al-Gharbiyye 
Baqa al-Gharbiyye held its municipal election in 2019 rather than in 2018. Rayyid Daka won the election via runoff.

Baqa al-Gharbiyye's council consists of 15 seats, presently held by eleven different parties. Daka was not elected to the council and is thus its sixteenth member.

Be'er Ya'akov 
Be'er Ya'akov is led by Nissim Gozlan, who was first elected in 2003. In 2021, Be'er Ya'akov's classification was changed from a local council to a city.

Beersheba 
Beersheba is led by Ruvik Danilovich, who was first elected in 2008. In 2018, Danilovich was re-elected with 92% of the vote, while his party won 16 of the council's 31 seats.

Bu'eine Nujeidat 
Bu'eine Nujeidat is led by Munir Hamuda, who was first elected in 2018.

Buq'ata 
Buq'ata is one of four local councils in the Golan Heights who were managed, until 2018, by Israeli-appointed local residents, and who first held local elections in 2018. Most local residents boycotted the election, leading to Abbas Abu Awad and his party winning unopposed.

Bir al-Maksur 
Bir al-Maksur is led by Khaled Hujirat, who was first elected in 2018.

Bir al-Maksur's council consists of nine seats divided between seven parties.

Beit El 
Beit El is led by Shai Alon, who was first elected in 2013.

Beit El's council consists of nine seats divided between three parties.

Beit Aryeh-Ofarim 
Beit Aryeh-Ofarim is led by Yehuda Alboym, who was first elected in 2018. On 8 May 2022, Beit Aryeh-Ofarim's council was dissolved after failing to pass a budget and replaced by an Interior Ministry committee. The Ministry also held a hearing on removing Alboym from his post, but decided against it.

Beit Jann 
Beit Jann is led by Radi Nagam, who was first elected via runoff in 2018.

Beit Dagan 
Beit Dagan is led by Eli Dadon, who was first elected in 2018.

Beit Dagan's council consists of nine seats, five held by the Local Movement for Beit Dagan and four by the Tnufa Neto party. Dadon's party was not elected to the council, but he serves as its tenth member.

Beit She'an 
Beit She'an is led by Jackie Levy, who was elected in 2018. Levy had previously served as the city's mayor between 2003 and 2013. In August of 2022, soccer player Eitan Tayeb announced his intention to challenge Levy, with city councilwoman Oshrat Barel announcing her own campaign in October, while former mayor Rafi Ben Shitrit and Noam Juma announced their campaigns in November.

Beit Shemesh 
Beit Shemesh is led by Aliza Bloch, who was first elected in 2018. 

Beit Shemesh's council consists of 21 seats held by six parties.

Beitar Illit 
Beitar Illit is led by Meir Rubinstein, who became the mayor in 2007.

Beitar Illit's council consists of 17 seats presently held by six parties. Rubinstein's party was not elected to the council, but he serves as its twenty-second member.

Bnei Brak 
Bnei Brak is led by Avraham Rubinstein.

Bnei Brak's council consists of 27 seats, with Rubinstein's party, a local chapter of United Torah Judaism, holding sixteen seats. Shas holds six seats, Bnei Torah holds three, while Yachad and Likud hold one seat each.

Bnei Ayish 
Bnei Ayish is led by Aryeh Gerale, a member of Likud, who was first elected in 2013.

Binyamina-Giv'at Ada 
Binyamina-Giv'at Ada is led by Itay Viceberg, who became its leader in 2017 after his predecessor, Pinhas Zu-Aretz, died. Viceberg will not seek re-election in 2023.

Binyamina-Giv'at Ada's council consists of 13 seats, presently held by five parties.

Basma 
Basma is led by Reyad Kabha, who was elected in 2013. He previously led Basma from 2005 to 2009.

Basmat Tab'un 
Basmat Tab'un is led by Rayyid Zubidat, who was first elected in 2018 via runoff.

Bi'ina 
Bi'ina is led by Ali Khalil, who was first elected in 2018.

Bat Yam 
In 2017, Interior Minister Aryeh Deri made the decision to merge Bat Yam into Tel Aviv, which would have made the 2018 election Bat Yam's last. Deri reversed his decision in 2021, shortly before the end of his tenure as Interior Minister, due to a successful effort to reduce the city's deficit. In the 2018 election, Likud member Zvika Brot defeated incumbent Mayor Yossi Bachar via runoff. Former Mayor Shlomo Lahiani, who was removed from office in 2015 after being found guilty of Breach of Trust, is considered a potential candidate in 2023, while Bachar has announced his intention to run.

Givat Ze'ev 
Giv'at Ze'ev is led by Yossi Avrahami, who was first elected in 2008.

Giv'at Shmuel 
Giv'at Shmuel is led by Yossi Brodny, who was first elected in 2008. Brodny ran for a seat in the Knesset in 2022 as part of The Jewish Home but was not elected.

Givatayim 
Givatayim is led by Ran Kunik, who was first elected in 2013. Kunik was re-elected unopposed in 2018.

Givatayim's council consists of fifteen seats held by seven parties.

Jadeidi-Makr 
Jadeidi-Makr is led by Suhil Malhan, who was first elected in 2018 via runoff.

Gedera 
Gedera is led by Yoel Gamliel, who was first elected in 2008.

Julis 
Julis is led by Vassam Nabuni, who was first elected in 2018 via runoff.

Jaljulia 
Jaljulia is led by Darwish Rabi, who was first elected in 2018.

Gan Yavne 
Gan Yavne is led by Aharon Dror, who was first elected in 2003.

Ganei Tikva 
Ganei Tikva is led by Lizzie Delrica, who was first elected in 2013.

Jisr az-Zarqa 
Jisr az-Zarqa is led by Muhammad Amash, who was first elected in 2013.

Jish 
Jish is led by Alias Alias, who is serving his fifth nonconsecutive term.

9 people were elected to the council in 2018 from six different parties.

Jatt 
Jatt held its municipal election in 2019 rather than in 2018. Khaled Gara was elected, defeating incumbent Muhammad Watad.

Jatts council consists of 11 seats, presently held by nine different parties. Gara was not elected to the council and is thus its twelfth member.

Daburiyya 
Daburiyya is led by Zuhir Yousafia.

Deir al-Asad 
Deir al-Asad is led by Ahmed Dabbah, who was elected in 2018 via runoff.

Deir Hanna 
Deir Hanna is led by Qasem Salam.

Dimona 
Dimona is led by Benny Biton, who was first elected in 2013.

Daliyat al-Karmel 
Daliyat al-Karmel is led by Rafik Halabi, who was first elected in 2018.

Hod HaSharon 
Hod HaSharon is led by Amir Kochavi, who was first elected via runoff in 2018.

Har Adar 
Har Adar is led by Haim Mandel Shaked, who was first elected in 2018.

Herzliya 
Herzliya is led by Moshe Fadlon, who was first elected in 2013.

Herzliya's council consists of 21 seats presently held by 12 different parties.

Zikhron Ya'akov 
Zikhron Ya'akov is led by Ziv Deshe, who became its leader in July of 2016.

Zemer 
Zemer is led by Tamim Hazralla, who was first elected via runoff in 2018.

Zarzir 
Zarzir is led by Amir Mzarib, who was first elected via runoff in 2018.

Hadera 
Hadera is led by Zvika Gendelman, who was first elected in 2018. In October of 2021, Gendelman was charged with Fraud and Breach of Trust, and received a six-month suspension in January of 2021, with Nir Ben-Haim serving as acting mayor during that period.

Holon 
Holon is led by Moti Sasson, who was first elected in 1993.

Hura 
Hura is led by Habas Al-Atuna, who was first elected in 2018.

Hurfeish 
Hurfeish is led by Rafik Mari, who was first elected in 2018.

Haifa 

Haifa is led by Einat Kalisch-Rotem, who was first elected in 2018, defeating incumbent Yona Yahav.

Haifa's council consists of 31 seats, presently held by 15 different parties.

In July of 2021, parties in the City Council formed the Change Council, an informal coalition of parties opposing Rotem, which holds a majority on the City Council. Later that month, two of Rotem's deputy mayors were removed from office by the City Council, and replaced by Change Council members in August.

Lawyer David Etzioni, with the support of City Councillor Tammy Barak, has announced his candidacy for Mayor. As has former deputy mayor Israel Savyon, who will lead a pensioners party.

Hatzor HaGlilit 
Hatzor HaGlilit is led by Shimon Swissa, who was first elected in 2008.

Harish 
Harish is led by Yitzhak Keshet, who was first elected in 2013. Harish was a Local council until May 2022, when it was declared a City due to rapid population growth.

In September of 2021, Yitzhak Bachar announced his intention to run for Mayor, as did Yamina activist Yossi Ezrahi. The Liberal Party will seek election to the city council.

Tuba-Zangariyye 
Tuba-Zangariyye is led by Visam Pazi Omar, who was first elected in 2018.

Tiberias 
Tiberias was led by Ron Cobi, who was first elected in 2018 and was ousted as mayor on 14 January 2020 over his failure to approve a budget, due to disagreements with city council members. Cobi has announced his intention to run for Mayor, as have Lawyers Shani Ilouz, Meir Almaikes and Aviv Yitzhak.

Tur'an 
Tur'an is led Mazen Adui, who was elected in 2018, defeating his predecessor in the first round.

Tayibe 
Tayibe held its municipal election in 2019 rather than in 2018. Shua Masrawa Mansur, who was first elected in 2011, was re-elected. He will be opposed by Abd al-Hakim Hajj Yahya.

Tayibe's council consists of 15 seats presently held by 11 parties. Mansur's party was not elected to the council, but he serves as its sixteenth representative.

Tira 
Tira is led by Ma'amun Abed Alhi, who was first elected in 2018.

Tira's council consists of 15 seats presently held by 11 parties.

Tirat Carmel 
Tirat Carmel is led by Aryeh Tal, who became its leader in 2009, previously serving between 1993 and 2003. Tal was re-elected in 2018 via runoff.

Tamra 
Tamra is led by Suhil Diab, who was first elected in 2013 and re-elected in 2018 via runoff.

Yanuh-Jat 
Yanuh-Jat is led by Muammad Sa'ad.

Yanuh-Jat's council consists of nine seats presently held by nine parties.

Yavne'el 
Yavne'el is led by Shanir Arish, who defeated his predecessor via runoff in 2018.

Yavne 
Yavne is led by Roei Gabay, who was elected Mayor via special election in November of 2022 to replace his predecessor, Zvi Gov-Ari, who died in office. Gabay defeated acting mayor Haim Masing, winning 51% of the vote to Masing's 47%.

Yavne's council consists of 15 seats, 5 held by the Our Yavne party, and 10 divided between six smaller parties.

Yehud-Monosson 
Yehud-Monosson is led by Ya'ala Maclise, who was first elected in 2013 and re-elected via runoff in 2018. She will be challenged by City Councillor Lior Gilboa, who announced his bid for Mayor in November of 2022.

Neve Monosson, which acts as an autonomous Borough within Yehud-Monosson, will hold an election for its nine-member board. the Kolenu Neve party, who currently hold all nine seats, will run for both the Borough and City councils.

Yesud HaMa'ala 
Yesud HaMa'ala is led by Ilan Or, who was first elected in 2013.

Yafa an-Naseriyye 
Yafa an-Naseriyye is led by Maher Halila, who was first elected in 2018.

Yokneam Illit 
Yokneam Illit is led by Simon Alfasi, who became its mayor in 1989. In June of 2022, Alfasi announced that he will not seek re-election in 2023. Several candidates have announced their intention to run, including City Councillor Yaron Hen, former Member of the Knesset Leah Fadida and deputy Mayor Roman Peres.

Yokneam Illit's council consists of 13 seats presently held by seven parties.

Yeruham 
Yeruham is led by Tal Ohana, who was first elected in 2018, replacing Michael Biton.

Yeruham's council consists of 11 seats, 4 held by Ohana's 'One Yeruham' Party and seven held by four smaller parties.

Jerusalem 

Jerusalem's Mayor is Moshe Lion, who was first elected in 2018, defeating Ofer Berkovitch in a runoff.

Jerusalem's council consists of 31 seats, with Lion, whose party didn't win seats on the council, serving as its 32nd member. Lion's party later merged with the local chapter of Likud. 5 seats are held by Berkovitch's party, Hitorerut. 6 seats are held by Degel HaTorah, 5 are held by Shas, 3 are held by Agudat Yisrael, 2 seats are held by Likud, 2 by Aryeh King's United Party, 2 by Hagit Moshe's The Jewish Home, 2 by the Jerusalem will Succeed party, 1 by Meretz, 1 by Bnei Torah, and one by the Saving Jerusalem list. Hitorerut initially held seven seats, but were reduced to five after two members left the party in April of 2021 and formed the Together in Jerusalem party.

In October of 2022, Ofer Berkovitch announced that he will not seek re-election to the City Council, and resigned as Hitorerut's leader. He was succeeded as leader by Councillor Adir Schwartz.

An Arab party will seek election to the council in 2023.

Yarka 
Yarka is led by Wahib Habish.

Kabul 
Kabul is led by Salah Riyyan, who was re-elected via runoff in 2018.

Kaukab Abu Al-Hija 
Kaukab Abu al-Hija is led by Zaher Salah.

Kokhav Ya'ir 
Kokhav Ya'ir is led by Yuval Arad.

Kokhav Ya'ir's council consists of 11 seats. 7 Are held by Arad's Gal Party, and four are held by the One Coummunity Party, whose leader is Shimi Ariel, Arad's predecessor.

Kuseife 
Kuseife is led by Abd Al-Aziz Nasasra, who was first elected in 2018.

Kisra-Sumei 
Kisra-Sumei is led by Yasser Jdaban, who was elected unopposed in 2018. Jdaban's party, Aluhda, won all nine seats on the local council.

Ka'abiyye-Tabbash-Hajajre 
Ka'abiyye-Tabbash-Hajajre is led by Rafa Hajajra, who was first elected in 2018 via runoff.

Kafr Bara 
Kafr Bara is led by Mahmud Asi.

Kafr Bara's council consists of nine seats presently held by nine parties.

Kfar Vradim 
Kfar Vradim is led by Eyal Shmueli, who was first elected in 2018 via runoff.

Kafr Yasif 
Kafr Yasif is led by Shadi Zidan, who was first elected in 2018.

Kafr Manda 
In 2018, Kafr Manda held a municipal election, in which Munas Abd Al-Halim defeated Ali Zeidan. After the result was appealed, the election was voided and redone on 22 February 2022, with Zeidan defeating Al-Halim in the redo.

Kfar Saba 
Kfar Saba is led by Rafi Saar, who was first elected via runoff in 2018.

Kafr Qasim 
Kafr Qasim is led by Adal Badir.

Kafr Qara 
Kafr Qara is led by Paras Bdahi, who was elected in 2018 via runoff.

Kfar Shmaryahu 
Kfar Shmaryahu is led by Serg Kurshi.

Kfar Shmaryahu's council consists of seven seats presently held by three parties.

Kfar Tavor 
Kfar Tavor is led by Oded Halperin, who was first elected in 2018. Both Halperin and Opposition Leader Eli Gabbay have announced their intention to run in 2023.

Kfar Tavor's council consists of nine seats presently held by three parties.

Karmiel 
Karmiel is led by Moshe Kuninsky who was first elected in 2018.  In January 2023, Alon Azulai, a member of Likud and former Kuninsky aide, announced his intention to run for mayor, alleging that Kuninsky's wife attempted to blackmail him.

Lehavim 
Lehavim is led by Yossi Nissan, who was first elected via runoff in 2018.

Lod 
Lod is led by incumbent Likud member Yair Revivo, who announced in 2021 that he will seek re-election in 2023.

Lod's council consists of 19 seats, 6 are held by Likud, 6 are held by the United Arab List, 3 are held by The Jewish Home, 2 are held by Lod Beitenu, the local chapter of Yisrael Beiteinu, 1 is held by Shas, and one is held by the 'We All have a Future' list.

Lakiya 
Lakiya is led by Ahmad Al-Assad, who was first elected via runoff in 2018.

Mevaseret Zion 
Mevaseret Zion is led by Yoram Shimon, who was first elected in 2013. Shimon was re-elected unopposed in 2018.

Mevaseret Zion's council consists of 15 seats presently held by six parties.

Majd al-Krum 
Majd al-Krum is led by Salim Salibi

Migdal 
Migdal is led by Natanel Alfasi, who was first elected in 2018.

Migdal HaEmek 
Migdal HaEmek is led by Eli Barada, who was first elected in 1998. City Councillor Yeki Ben-Haim, who challenged Barada in 2018, and former City Councillor Hen Shaul have both announced their intention to run to replace Barada in 2023.

Majdal Shams 
Majdal Shams is one of four local councils in the Golan Heights who were managed, until 2018, by Israeli-appointed local residents, and who first held local elections in 2018. Most local residents boycotted the election, leading to Dulan Abu Salah and his party winning unopposed.

Modi'in-Maccabim-Re'ut 
Modi'in-Maccabim-Re'ut is led by Haim Bibas, who was first elected in 2008. Bibas was re-elected unopposed in 2018. Maccabim-Re'ut, which acts as an autonomous Borough within Modi'in-Maccabim-Re'ut, will hold an election for its nine-member board.

Modi'in Illit 
Modi'in Illit is led by Ya'akov Asher Gutterman, a member of Degel HaTorah who became its leader in 2000.

Mazkeret Batya 
Mazkeret Batya is led by Gabi Gaon, who was first elected in 2018.

Mazra'a 
Mazra'a is led by Fuad Awad.

Metula 
Metula is led by David Azulai, who became its leader in 2015.

Meitar 
Meitar is led by Shimon Mazuz, who was first elected in 2018 via runoff.

Mas'ade 
Mas'ade is one of four local councils in the Golan Heights who were managed, until 2018, by Israeli-appointed local residents, and who first held local elections in 2018. Most local residents boycotted the election, with all candidates for both the council and its leadership dropping out before the election. As a result, the Interior Ministry appointed a temporary committee to manage the council.

Maghar 
Maghar, previously a local council, was reclassified as a city in October of 2021. Maghar is led by Farid Ghanem, who was first elected in 2018 via runoff.

Mi'ilya 
Mi'ilya is led by Hatem Aaref.

Ma'ale Adumim 
Ma'ale Adumim is led by Benny Kashriel, who became its leader in 1992.

Ma'ale Adumim's council consists of 15 seats presently held by four parties.

Ma'ale Efraim 
Ma'ale Efrayim is led by Shomo Lalush, who was elected unopposed in 2018.

Ma'ale Iron 
Ma'ale Iron is led by Mahmud Jbarin, who was first elected in 2018.

Ma'ale Iron's council consists of 13 seats presently held by six parties.

Ma'alot-Tarshiha 
Ma'alot-Tarshiha is led by Arkady Pummerantz, who defeated previous mayor Shlomo Bohbot, who held office for 42 years, in 2018.

Mitzpe Ramon 
Mitzpe Ramon is led by Roni Marom, who was first elected in 2013.

Mitzpe Ramon's council consists of nine seats presently held by six parties.

Mashhad 
Mashhad is led by Vajiya Saliman, who was first elected via runoff in 2018.

Nahariya 
Nahariya is led by Ronen Marelly, who defeated incumbent Jackie Sabag in 2018.

Nof HaGalil 
Nof HaGalil is led by Ronen Plot, who was first elected in a special election in 2016. Plot was re-elected unopposed in 2018.

Plot's party won 13 seats on Nof HaGalil's council, with three seats going to the list for coexistence and one going to the United Religious Front.

Nahf 
Nahf is led by Abd Al-Bast Kis, who was first elected via runoff in 2018.

Ness Ziona 
Ness Ziona is led by Shmuel Boxer, who was first elected in 2018.

Nazareth 
Nazareth is led by Ali Sallam, who was first elected in 2013.

Nesher 
Nesher is led by Roi Levi, who was first elected in 2018.

Netivot 
Netivot is led by Yehiel Zohar, who was first elected in 1989.

Netanya 
Netanya is led by Miriam Feirberg, who became its mayor in 1998.

Sajur 
Sajur is led by Jaber Hamud, who was re-elected in 2018 by a 10-vote margin.

Savyon 
Savyon is led by Motti Landau, who was first elected in 2013.

Savyon's council consists of nine seats presently held by three parties.

Sakhnin 
Sakhnin is led by Safuat Abu-Ri'ya, a member of Hadash, who was first elected in 2018, defeating incumbent Mazen Ghnaim.

Sakhnin's council consists of 15 seats presently held by 12 parties.

Ghajar 
Ghajar, which is partially in Lebanon, is led by Ahmad Fatali, who was first elected in 2003, replacing his uncle.

Omer 
Omer is led by Pini Badash, who became its leader in 1990.

Eilabun 
Eilabun is led by Samir Abu Ziyyad, who was first elected in 2018.

Ilut 
Ilut is led by Abrahim Abu Ras.

Ein Mahil 
Ein Mahil is led by Ahmed Habiballa, who was first elected in 2018.

Ein Qiniyye 
Ein Qiniyye is one of four local councils in the Golan Heights who were managed, until 2018, by Israeli-appointed local residents, and who first held local elections in 2018. Due to a boycott, only two candidates ran for the council's leadership. Wahil Mugrabi, who received 20 votes, and Samira Rada Amran, who only received one vote.

Acre 
Acre is led by Shimon Lankri, who was first elected in 2003. Lankri announced in November of 2022 that he won't seek re-election in 2023.

Immanuel 
Immanuel is led by Eliyahu Gafni, a member of Agudat Yisrael.

Immanuel's council consists of nine seats presently held by six parties, with Gafni, whose party didn't win any seats, serving as the council's tenth member.

Isfiya 
Isfiya is led by Bahij Mansur, who was first elected in 2018.

Isfiya's council consists of 11 seats presently held by 11 parties.

Afula 
Afula is led by Avii Elkabetz, who was elected in 2018. Elkabetz was previously mayor from 2005 to 2013. Elkabetz and former mayor Yitzhak Maron have both expressed interest in seeking re-election, as have Rami Yosef, City Councillor Shlomo Melihi, and Dov Hirsch.

Arraba 
Arraba is led by Omar Wahad, who was first elected in 2018.

Arad 
Arad is led by Nissan Ben Hemo, who was first elected via special election in 2015 and was re-elected in 2018.

Ar'ara 
Ar'ara is led by Muder Yunis, who was first elected via runoff in 2018.

Ar'ara's council consists of 13 seats presently held by eight parties.

Ar'arat an-Naqab 
Ar'arat an-Naqab is led by Narif Abu Arar.

Fureidis 
Fureidis is led by Ayman Mari, who was first elected in 2018.

Fureidis' council consists of 11 seats presently held by seven parties. Mari's list was not elected to the council, but he serves as its twelfth member.

Fassuta 
Fassuta is led by Adgar Dachuar.

Peki'in 
Peki'in is led by Sawid Swid.

Pardes Hanna-Karkur 
Pardes Hanna-Karkur is led by Hagar Perry Yagur, who was first elected in 2018.

Pardes Hanna-Karkur's council consists of 15 seats presently held by eight parties.

Pardesiya 
Pardesiya is led by Tal Gurky, who was first elected in 2013.

Petah Tikva 
Petah Tikva is led by Rami Greenberg, who was first elected in 2018, defeating incumbent mayor Itzik Braverman. City Councillor Orna Davidai and former advisor to Member of the Knesset Nir Orbach Or Barak have both announced their intention to run for Mayor in 2023. Former Mayor Uri Ahad has expressed an interest in potentially running for Mayor.

Petah Tikva's council presently consists of 29 seats. 5 Are held by Greenberg's Hithadshut Party, 4 are held by Yesh Atid, 4 by Shas, 3 by Braverman's Echpat party, 3 by The Jewish Home, and three by the Bitzuistim party. Mechubarim, Excelling with Gennady, and United Torah Judaism each hold two seats, while Likud holds a single seat.

Safed 
Safed is led by Shuki Ohana, a member of Likud, who was first elected in 2018 via runoff.

Kedumim 
Kedumim is led by Hananel Dorani, who was first elected in 2007.

Kadima-Zoran 
Kadima-Zoran is led by Keren Green, who was first elected in 2018.

Qalansawe 
Qalansawe is led by Abd al-Bast Salama, who was first elected via runoff in 2018.

Katzrin 
Katzrin is led by Dimitry Afratsav, who was first elected in 2013.

Katzrin's council consists of nine seats presently held by three parties.

Kiryat Ono 
Kiryat Ono is led by Israel Gal, who was first elected in 2013.

Kiryat Arba 
Kiryat Arba is led by Eliyahu Libman, who was first elected in 2013.

Kiryat Ata 
Kiryat Ata is led by Ya'akov Peretz, who became its leader in 1996.

Kiryat Bialik 
Kiryat Bialik is led by Eli Dukorsky, who was first elected in 2008. Dukorsky was re-elected unopposed in 2018. Lawyer Maimon Pe'er has announced his intention to challenge Dukorsky in 2023.

Kiryat Gat 
Kiryat Gat is led by Aviram Dahari, who was first elected in 2003.

Kiryat Tiv'on 
Kiryat Tiv'on is led by Iddo Greenblum, who was first elected via runoff in 2018.

Kiryat Yam 
Kiryat Yam is led by David Even Zur, who was first elected in 2013.

Kiryat Ye'arim 
Kiryat Ye'arim re-elected incumbent Avraham Rosental, who died before being sworn in for a second term. Yitzhak Ravitz, a councillor from Rosental's party, was appointed as the council's acting leader, before being replaced by Yanki Flei in a 2019 special election.

Kiryat Motzkin 
Kiryat Motzkin is led by Haim Tzuri, who became its mayor in 1993. Tzuri will seek re-election despute being charged with Bribery and Breach of Privacy in June of 2022. He will be opposed by Tziki Avishar, the leader of the local opposition.

Kiryat Malakhi 
Kiryat Malakhi is led by Eliyahu Zohar, a member of The Jewish Home, who was first elected in 2013.

Kiryat Malakhi's council consists of 13 seats presently held by seven parties.

Kiryat Ekron 
Kiryat Ekron is led by Hovev Tsabari, who was first elected in 2013.

Kiryat Shmona 
Kiryat Shmona is led by Avichai Stern, who was elected in 2018, defeating his predecessor is a runoff.

Karnei Shomron 
Karnei Shomron is led by Yigal Lahav, who was first elected in 2013.

Rameh 
Rameh is led by Shauki Latif.

Rosh HaAyin 
Rosh HaAyin is led by Shalom Ben-Moshe, who was first elected in 2013. Ben-Moshe was re-elected via runoff in 2018.

Rosh Pinna 
Rosh Pinna is led by Motti Hatiel, who was first elected via runoff in 2018.

Rishon LeZion 
Rishon LeZion is led by Raz Kinstlich, who was first elected in 2018, defeating incumbent Dov Zur.

Rahat 
Rahat is led by Faiz Abu Sahiban, who was first elected in 2018, defeating his predecessor.

Rehovot 
Rehovot is led by Rahamim Malul, who became its mayor in 2009, and was re-elected unopposed in 2018. Malul has announced that he will seek re-election in 2023. He will be opposed by former Deputy Mayor Matan Dill.

Reineh 
Reineh is led by Jamil Bassul.

Rekhasim 
Rekhasim is currently led by Dan Cohen, who is in a rotation agreement with Yitzhak Reich.

Ramla 
Ramla is led by Michael Videl, a member of Likud, who was first elected via special election in 2017.

Ramat Gan 
Ramat Gan is led by Carmel Shama, who was first elected in 2018, defeating Incumbent Mayor Yisrael Zinger in a runoff. Liad Ilani, who was a candidate in 2018 and a member of Shama's municipal coalition, left the coalition in April of 2021 and announced his intention to challenge Shama in 2023.

Ramat Gan's council consists of 25 seats presently held by 13 parties.

Ramat HaSharon 
Ramat HaSharon is led by Aviram Grover, who became its leader in 2016. Grover was re-elected via runoff in 2018.

Ramat Yishai 
Ramat Yishai is led by Ofer Ben-Eliezer, who was first elected in 2008.

Ramat Yishai's council consists of nine seats presently held by five parties.

Ra'anana 
Ra'anana is led by Haim Broida, who was first elected in 2018, defeating his predecessor Eitan Ginzburg in a runoff.

Ra'anana's council consists of 19 seats presently held by eight parties.

Shibli–Umm al-Ghanam 
Shibli–Umm al-Ghanam is led by Munir Shibli, who was first elected in 2018.

Shaqib al-Salam 
Shaqib al-Salam is led by Amar Abu-Ma'amar.

Shaqib al-Salam's council consists of 11 seats presently held by five parties.

Sderot 
Sderot is led by Alon Davidi, who was first elected in 2013.

Shoham 
Shoham is led by Eitan Petigro, who was first in 2018.

Shlomi 
Shlomi is led by Gabriel Ne'eman.

Sha'ab 
Sha'ab is led by Mahmud Buqa'i, who was first elected in 2018.

Shefa-Amr 
Shefa-Amr is led by Ursan Yassin, who was elected in 2018. Yassin previously served as mayor between 1998 and 2008.

Tel Aviv 
Tel Aviv is led by Ron Huldai, who was first elected in 1998. Huldai was re-elected in 2018, defeating former Deputy Mayor Asaf Zamir. Huldai has announced that he will seek re-election in 2023. Buisnessman Amos Shapira and City Councillor Zippi Brand Frank have announced their intention to challenge Huldai in 2023.

Tel Mond 
Tel Mond is led by Lin Kaplan, who was elected in a November 2020 Special election.

Tel Sheva 
Tel Sheva is led by Omar Abu Rakyik, who was first elected in 2018, where he won the runoff after his opponent withdrew from the race.

Other Authorities 
Both , Ne'ot Hovav and Migdal Tefen, will not hold elections in 2018, as the leader of their council is appointed by the Interior Minister.

Sha'ar HaShomron, a local council that was established in May of 2022, is currently led by Avi Roeh, who was appointed for a four year term.

The Committee of the Jewish Community of Hebron, which was established in 2017, governs approximately 1,000 jews who live in the city. The Committee held its first election in September of 2022, which was won by Eyal Gelman.

Yoav Regional Council will hold its election in May of 2023 due to the resignation of its leader, Matti Sarfati Harkavi, after her election to the Knesset.

References 

Future elections
2023
2023 in Israel
October 2023 events in Asia